Celtic seasons may refer to:
Celtic calendar
List of Boston Celtics seasons
List of Celtic F.C. seasons